Madrasa El Mettichia is one of the madrasahs of Tunis.

Location 

The madrasa is located in the southwest of the suburb of Bab Souika, between Ben Metticha and Bou Sandel streets.

History 
Madrasa El Mettichia was built in 1705 by Ahmed Lagha with the sober architecture of the Hafsid dynasty.

Description 
The building has a typical architecture: a courtyard with two porticos that gives access to the rooms and the prayer room. The latrines are separated from the courtyard by a small courtyard.

Nowadays, the madrasa is in a bad state.

References 

Mettichia